Bemidji Regional Airport  is three miles northwest of Bemidji, in Beltrami County, Minnesota, United States. It is owned by the city of Bemidji and Beltrami County.

The airport is used for general aviation and is served by SkyWest Airlines, as Delta Connection for Delta Air Lines. In 2012, a major terminal rehabilitation project was completed, which expanded the terminal from 13,000 square feet to almost 29,000 square feet.

Airline flights (Wisconsin Central DC-3s) began in 1951–52.

Facilities
It has two asphalt runways: 13/31 is 7,004 by 150 feet (2,135 x 46 m) and 7/25 is 5,700 by 150 feet (1,737 x 46 m). The airport does not have a control tower.

In 2015 the airport had 13,251 aircraft operations, average 36 per day: 59% general aviation, 23% airline, 13% air taxi and 5% military. In January 2017, 60 aircraft were based at this airport: 27 single-engine, 30 multi-engine and 3 helicopter.

Airlines and destinations

Passenger

Cargo

Statistics

Top destinations

Medevac
Bemidji Regional Airport is one of four locations for Sanford Health AirMed, a level 1 Trauma Center located in Fargo, North Dakota.

History
In 2020 the airport received a $1,123,770 CARES Act award.

On September 18, 2020, the Bemidji Airport was where President Donald J. Trump learned about the death of Supreme Court Justice Ruth Bader Ginsburg. Trump was notified of her death after a campaign rally while walking towards Air Force One.

References

External links
 Bemidji Regional Airport 
 AirCare Helicopter
   at Minnesota DOT airport directory
 Aerial image as of 19 May 1991 from USGS The National Map
 

Airports in Minnesota
Buildings and structures in Beltrami County, Minnesota
Transportation in Beltrami County, Minnesota
Essential Air Service